Valesdir Airport is an airport in Valesdir, Epi, Vanuatu .

Airlines and destinations

References

Airports in Vanuatu
Shefa Province